Mitsuhide Oishi Tsuchida (born in Pedro Juan Caballero, Paraguay) is a former Japanese Paraguayan Association football defender who played in Paraguay and Japan during the 1980s and 1990s.

References

Paraguayan footballers
Association football defenders
Paraguayan people of Japanese descent
1978 births
Living people
2 de Mayo footballers
Shonan Bellmare players
Cerro Corá footballers
Ventforet Kofu players